Lepiota spheniscispora is a species of agaric fungus in the family Agaricaceae. Found in central coastal California, it was described in 2001 by mycologist Else Vellinga.

See also
 List of Lepiota species

References

External links

Fungi described in 2001
Fungi of California
Fungi without expected TNC conservation status